William H. Kinsler  (November 9, 1867 – August 10, 1963) was a professional baseball player who played outfield in the Major Leagues for New York Giants of the National League. He appeared in one game, on June 8, 1893. The following season he played for the Nashville Tigers in the Southern Association. At the time of his death, he was the oldest living former major league player.

External links

1867 births
1963 deaths
19th-century baseball players
Major League Baseball outfielders
New York Giants (NL) players
Nashville Tigers players
Baseball players from New York City